Bogusław Tadeusz Wontor (born 29 September 1967 in Słubice) is a Polish politician. He was elected to the Sejm on 25 September 2005, getting 7793 votes in 8 Zielona Góra district as a candidate from Democratic Left Alliance list.

He was also a member of Sejm 2001-2005.

See also
Members of Polish Sejm 2005-2007

External links
Bogusław Wontor - parliamentary page - includes declarations of interest, voting record, and transcripts of speeches.

1967 births
Living people
People from Słubice
Democratic Left Alliance politicians
Members of the Polish Sejm 2001–2005
Members of the Polish Sejm 2005–2007
Members of the Polish Sejm 2007–2011
Members of the Polish Sejm 2011–2015
Members of the Polish Sejm 2015–2019